The Waterford Covered Bridge is a Town lattice truss covered bridge spanning LeBoeuf Creek in Waterford Township, Erie County in the U.S. state of Pennsylvania. The Waterford Covered Bridge is one of two remaining covered bridges in Erie County, along with the Harrington Covered Bridge. The bridge is also the only Town lattice truss bridge in the county and one of only 19 in Pennsylvania. It was documented by the Historic American Buildings Survey in 1936 and was listed on the National Register of Historic Places in 1980. In 2011, the bridge was closed due to its deteriorating condition.

Design 

The Waterford Covered Bridge is situated southeast of the borough of Waterford in Waterford Township.

The bridge was designed by Richard Cross using a Town lattice truss. The truss consists of a lattice of beams crossing at 45 to 60-degree angles and connected by wooden pins. There are only nineteen bridges remaining in Pennsylvania using the Town lattice, and the Waterford Covered Bridge is only one in Erie County. It is the also the only covered bridge in the county to have been painted, with the exterior of the bridge painted barn red. The bridge also has "an unusual, blue, metal pipe structure" attached to the abutments on the bridge's south side. The structure is supported with a king post framework and, presumably, connects to nearby pipelines.

Originally, a white sign was mounted above each portal that declared "Old Kissing Bridge built in 1875 by the Phelps Bros." Sometime in the mid-2000s, the sign was taken down. When the bridge was closed, large "Bridge Closed" signs were mounted in the same location with concrete barricades placed across the road on the bridge's approaches.

History 

The first covered bridge in the United States was built in 1805 over the Schuylkill River in Philadelphia, Pennsylvania. By the end of the 19th century, over 1,500 covered bridges were constructed across the state. In 1820, Ithiel Town patented his namesake lattice truss. The truss became particularly popular as it used smaller piece of lumber instead of the larger, heavier timbers that were more expensive to fabricate, and could easily be built by relatively unskilled builders. It was also strong enough that it became appropriated for using in wooden and iron railroad bridges.

The Waterford Covered Bridge was built in 1875 by the brothers Charles and James Phelps. An eyewitness to the construction recounted in 1936 that it took approximately two months to complete.

In 2001, Waterford Township was given a $54,000 grant by the Pennsylvania Historical and Museum Commission (PHMC) to replace the rafters, roofing, and shake shingles on the bridge.

Modern use and status 

, they are only two covered bridges in Erie County— the Waterford Covered Bridge and the Harrington Covered Bridge; both the Carmen Covered Bridge and Gudgeonville Covered Bridge were lost to arsons in 1996 and 2008, respectively.
The bridge has been damaged by oversized trucks attempting to cross it with the first incident occurring on June 17, 2003 involving a box truck. Several of the bridge's deck planks, support beams, and cross pieces were damaged, although the bridge's integrity was not compromised and was never closed to traffic. It has also been subjected to repeated vandalism with graffiti marking bridge surfaces. At one point, a deer carcass was even found hanging from the bridge's rafters.

After an assessment by state and federal highway officials in 2014, the Waterford Covered Bridge was found to need a substantial refurbishment before it could be safely reopened. Structural boards were found to be missing or loose, and the entire substructure needing to be replaced. PennDOT also proposed an overhead bar ahead of the bridge to prevent oversize trucks from reaching it, as well as lighting and security cameras to deter vandals.

See also 

 List of bridges on the National Register of Historic Places in Pennsylvania
 National Register of Historic Places listings in Erie County, Pennsylvania

References

Sources

External links

Bridges completed in 1875
Bridges in Erie County, Pennsylvania
Covered bridges on the National Register of Historic Places in Pennsylvania
Covered bridges in Erie County, Pennsylvania
Historic American Buildings Survey in Pennsylvania
Lattice truss bridges in the United States
Wooden bridges in Pennsylvania
National Register of Historic Places in Erie County, Pennsylvania
Road bridges on the National Register of Historic Places in Pennsylvania
1875 establishments in Pennsylvania